Fellowship is an unincorporated community in Marion County, Florida, United States. It is located near the intersection of U.S. 27 and County Road 464. The community is part of the Ocala Metropolitan Statistical Area.

Geography

References

Unincorporated communities in Marion County, Florida
Unincorporated communities in Florida